Younes Asadi (born 1963) is an Iranian politician.

Asadi was born in Meshginshahr, Ardabil Province. He is a member of the 8th and 9th Islamic Consultative Assembly from the electorate of Meshginshahr. and member of Iran-Azerbaijan Friendship society. Asadi won with 26,109 (31.00%) votes.

References

People from Meshginshahr
Deputies of Meshginshahr
Living people
1963 births
Members of the 9th Islamic Consultative Assembly
Members of the 8th Islamic Consultative Assembly
Iranian reformists
Followers of Wilayat fraction members